Song Tao (born 8 April 1982) is a former Chinese footballer.

Career statistics

Club

Notes

References

1982 births
Living people
Chinese footballers
Chinese expatriate footballers
Association football goalkeepers
Hong Kong Premier League players
Tai Chung FC players
Tianjin Tianhai F.C. players
Yunnan Flying Tigers F.C. players
Chinese expatriate sportspeople in Hong Kong
Expatriate footballers in Hong Kong